Ardal is a city in Chaharmahal and Bakhtiari Province, Iran.

 Ardal O'Hanlon (born 1965), Irish actor and comedian

Ardal may also refer to:
 Ardal, Fars
 Ardal, Isfahan
 Ardal County, in Chaharmahal and Bakhtiari Province

See also
 Årdal (disambiguation)